Ri Yong-rae is a North Korean politician. He is a member of the Central Committee of the Workers' Party of Korea.

Biography
Born in Jangryong of the People's Army of Korea, he was promoted to Lieutenant General in February 2012 after being a Major general in April 2002. In May 2016, at the 7th Congress of the Workers' Party of Korea, he was appointed to the 7th Central Committee of the Workers' Party of Korea and the head of the Civil Defense Department of the Workers' Party of Korea. In March 2014, he was elected at the 13th convocation to the Supreme People's Assembly.

References

Members of the Supreme People's Assembly
Workers' Party of Korea politicians